A destructive severe weather episode affected portions of the Midwestern and Southern United States from April 30–May 2, 1967. It consisted of two consecutive tornado outbreaks that generated at least 38 tornadoes, causing 13 fatalities and 90 injuries. All of the deaths occurred on April 30, which is known as the 1967 Iowa–Minnesota tornado outbreak, or Black Sunday, to residents of Iowa and southern Minnesota. That day spawned a total of 21 tornadoes, devastating the towns of Albert Lea and Waseca, Minnesota.

Background

Beginning on April 30, 1967, a potent mid-latitude cyclone generated severe weather, including blizzards and severe thunderstorms, across a broad region extending from the northernmost High Plains and Rocky Mountains to the Mississippi and Ohio River valleys. These conditions occurred within a seventy-two-hour-long span. By 1:00 p.m. CDT (12:00 p.m. CST; 18:00 UTC) on April 30, a low-pressure area of at most  was centered near Pierre, South Dakota, with a stationary front superimposed from north of Sioux Falls to near LaCrosse, Wisconsin. Nearby, a warm front also attended from south of Sioux Falls to near Des Moines, Iowa, and St. Louis, Missouri. As the warm sector advanced into northernmost Iowa and southern Minnesota, surface air temperatures rose into the 60s and low 70s °F, while dew points reached the 60s °F. Winds at the surface ranged from  out of the east-southeast. By 7:00 p.m. CDT (6:00 p.m. CST; 00:00 UTC), the warm front migrated to near the Minnesota-Iowa border, while the mid-level trough associated with the surface cyclone acquired a negative tilt. At the same time, a strong jet stream brought deep-layer wind shear over portions of northern Iowa and southern Minnesota—indicating favorable conditions for tornadogenesis.

Daily statistics

Confirmed tornadoes

April 30 event

May 1 event

May 2 event

See also
Tornado outbreak of April 22–23, 2020 – Produced an even stronger EF3 tornado in Onalaska that killed three and injured 33 others
Climate of Minnesota
List of North American tornadoes and tornado outbreaks

Notes

References

Sources

External links

F4 tornadoes by date
Southern Minnesota,1967-04-30
Tornadoes of 1967
Tornadoes in South Dakota
Tornadoes in Iowa
Tornadoes in Minnesota
Tornadoes in Texas
Tornadoes in Arkansas
Tornadoes in Louisiana
Tornadoes in Mississippi
Tornadoes in Kentucky
Tornadoes in South Carolina
1967 in Minnesota
Tornado outbreak sequence,30